was a town located in Aki District, Hiroshima Prefecture, Japan.

As of 2003, the town had an estimated population of 2,532 and a density of 133.97 persons per km2. The total area was 18.90 km2.

On March 20, 2005, Kamagari, along with the towns of Ondo and Kurahashi (all from Aki District), and the towns of Yasuura, Toyohama and Yutaka (all from Toyota District), was merged into the expanded city of Kure and no longer exists as an independent municipality.

Geography
The town of Kamagari is the main settlement of the Kamagari Islands.

Climate

References

External links
 Official website of Kure  (some English content)

Dissolved municipalities of Hiroshima Prefecture